Greece competed at the 2015 World Championships in Athletics in Beijing, China, from 22–30 August 2015. A team of 10 athletes, 5 men and 5 women, represented the country in a total of 10 events.

Medalists

Results
(q – qualified, NM – no mark, SB – season best)

Men
Track and road events

Field events

Women 
Track and road events

Field events

Combined events – Heptathlon

Sources 
Official website
Official IAAF competition website
Greek team 

}

Nations at the 2015 World Championships in Athletics
World Championships in Athletics
Greece at the World Championships in Athletics